Vukhuclepis lyhoaensis is an extinct, primitive antiarch placoderm. Specimens are of mostly complete thoracic armor from the Early Devonian Ly Hoa Formation in Vietnam. The armor is very similar to that of Yunnanolepis, but is distinguished by a unique pattern of raised ridges radiating from a point at the center of the dorsal shield of the thoracic armor. A similar, albeit more floral-looking pattern is seen in the Chinese Mizia. V. lyhaoensis' armor is further ornamented with small tubercles.

References 

Antiarchi
Placoderm genera
Placoderms of Asia
Lochkovian life
Fossils of Vietnam
Fossil taxa described in 1996